Zaviyeh-ye Kivi (also Romanized as Zāvīyeh-ye Kīvī) is a village in Khvoresh Rostam-e Shomali Rural District, Khvoresh Rostam District, Khalkhal County, Ardabil Province, Iran.

It is located in the Alborz (Elburz) mountain range.

At the 2006 census, its population was 57, in 20 families.

References 

Towns and villages in Khalkhal County
Settled areas of Elburz